The 2014 Moscow Victory Day Parade took place in Red Square on 9 May 2014 to commemorate the 69th anniversary of the capitulation of Nazi Germany in 1945, which formally ended hostilities in the Second World War in Europe. The annual parade marks the Allied victory in the Great Patriotic War on the same day as the signing of the German act of capitulation to the Allies in Berlin, at midnight of May 9, 1945 (Russian time). President of Russia Vladimir Putin delivered his eleventh holiday address to the nation on this day.

Parade specifics 
Members of the Presidential Cavalry Squadron of the Kremlin Regiment took part in the part to honour the contributions of the Red Army Cavalry Corps Joining the parade for the first time were the cadets of the Tver Suvorov Military School and the Kronstadt Sea Cadet Corps. In the mobile column, the Tor-M2U air-defense missile systems, the 9M123 Khrizantema tracked tank destroyers and Typhoon-K APCs were also seen. This year's mobile column had a record 149 military vehicles in attendance, with 69 planes (including for the very first time 4 Yak-130s from a newly formed air aerobatics group, the "tactical air wing" formation by pilots from the Lipetsk State Aviation Center and also for the first time, in a late addition to compensate for the absences of the Russian Knights and Swifts aerobatics teams that were in Sevastopol, four brand-new Mil Mi-35s) forming the fly-past.

Minister of Defense of the Russian Federation General of the Army Sergey Shoigu inspected the parade for the second time, and this year's parade commander was the Deputy Chief of the General Staff of the Russian Armed Forces, Colonel General Oleg Salyukov.

Preparation 
Beginning in November/December 2013, preparations for the parade were well attended at the unit level. Individual unit practices were held in the various military installations for all the participating units. Full-scale rehearsals officially started on March 31, 2014, in the Alabino training grounds in Moscow Oblast, with the rehearsals there to formally conclude in April the same year in order to prepare for the practice runs in Moscow's Red Square in May. Also rehearsing for the parade are the massed military bands of the Armed Forces and the Moscow Garrison, all to be conducted for the 12th straight year by Lieutenant General Valery Khalilov, the Senior Director of Music of the Bands Service of the Russian Armed Forces, and the units and vehicles forming the mobile column. Practice runs for the Russian Knights and Swifts air aerobatics teams that formed part of the fly past column commenced on April 6, 2014. A first general practice run (without the flypast) was held in the Alabino grounds on April 7, 2014, with another run finished on the 11th.

April 16, 2014 saw the first joint practice run of the parade at the Alabino grounds including the fly past column for the first time. Also found joining the parade for the first time in 4 years was the 1st Cavalry Squadron from the Presidential Cavalry Escort Battalion, Kremlin Regiment. The Moscow leg of the practice runs commenced on April 21, 2014 with the mobile column driving its way along Tverskaya Street for its first practice run in the capital. This was followed by the first night practice runs on Red Square itself, joined by the bands, the marching troops and the mobile column, which began on April 29 to 30.

The air flypast column held a practice run above the skies of Moscow on May 3, 2014. All 69 planes joining this year's parade took part, and the run-through was cheered on by both Muscovites and tourists alike. A final nighttime practice run was held on May 5 on Moscow's Red Square. And on May 7, despite the cold weather earlier that day, a final parade practice run was held that morning at 10AM Moscow Time, with General of the Army Shoigu inspecting and with Colonel General Salyukov leading the contingents, just as they would have done in the actual parade.

Full order of the parade 

Bold indicates first appearance, italic indicates multiple appearances, Bold and italic indicate returning appearance, all indicated unless otherwise noted.

 General of the Army Sergey Shoigu, Minister of Defense of the Russian Federation (parade inspector)
 Colonel General Oleg Salyukov, Commander-in-Chief of the Russian Ground Forces (parade commander)

Military Bands 
 Massed Military Bands of the Armed Forces under the direction of the Senior Director of Music of the Military Bands Service of the Armed Forces of the Russian Federation, Lieutenant General Valery Khalilov
 Corps of Drums of the Moscow Military Music School

Ground Column 
 154th Preobrazhensky Independent Commandant's Regiment Colour Guard and Honour Guard Company of the 1st Honor Guard Battalion, 154th PICR
 Presidential Cavalry Escort Battalion, Kremlin Regiment (returning)
 Suvorov Military School (first appearance for the Tver branch)
 Nakhimov Naval School
 Kronstadt Sea Cadet Corps (first appearance)
 Aksanskiy Cossack Cadet Corps
 Combined Arms Academy of the Armed Forces of the Russian Federation
 Military University of the Ministry of Defence of the Russian Federation
 Military Academy of Material and Technical Security "General of the Army A. V. Khrulev" 
 Zhukovsky – Gagarin Air Force Academy
 Baltic Naval Military Institute "Admiral Fyodor Ushakov" (returning)
 382nd Independent Marine Battalion of the Black Sea Fleet (first appearance)
 336th Independent Guards Biaystok Marine Brigade of the Baltic Fleet
 Military Space Academy "Alexander Mozhaysky"
 Peter the Great Military Academy of the Strategic Missile Forces (returning)
 Ryazan Guards Higher Airborne Command School "Gen. of the Army Vasily Margelov" 98th Guards Airborne Division
 1st NBC Coastal Brigade
 9th Chemical Disposal Regiment
 29th and 38th Independent Railway Brigades of the Russian Railway Troops
 16th Spetsnaz Brigade, Western Military District (returning)
 ODON Ind. Motorized Internal Troops Division of the Ministry of Internal Affairs of the Russian Federation "Felix Dzerzhinsky"
 Civil Defense Academy of the Ministry of Emergency Situations
 Moscow Border Guards Institute of the Border Guard Service of the Federal Security Service of the Russian Federation "Moscow City Council"
 2nd Guards Tamanskaya Motor Rifle Division "Mikhail Kalinin"
 4th Guards Kantemirovskaya Tank Division "Yuri Andropov"
 Military Technical University of the Federal Agency of Special Construction
 Moscow Military Commanders Training School "Supreme Soviet of Russia"

 Mobile Column 
 GAZ-2975
 BTR-80 and BTR-82A
 Typhoon-K armored personnel carrier (first appearance)
 T-90A
 9P157-2 Khrizantema-S tank destroyer (first appearance)
 2S19 Msta-S
 Buk-M2 missile system
 Tor-M2U missile system  (first appearance for the M2U variant)
 S-400 Triumf
 Pantsir-S1
 9K720 Iskander
 RS-24 Yars

 Air Fly Past Column 
 Mil Mi-26
 Mil Mi-8 Colors Party
 Mil Mi-24 
 Mil Mi-28 
 Mil Mi-35 (first appearance)
 Kamov Ka-52
 Mikoyan MiG-29
 Sukhoi Su-24
 Sukhoi Su-34
 Sukhoi Su-27
 Mikoyan MiG-31
 Ilyushin Il-76
 Ilyushin Il-78
 Tupolev Tu-22M3
 Tupolev Tu-95 
 Tupolev Tu-160
 Beriev A-50
 Sukhoi Su-25
 Antonov An-124
 Antonov An-22
 Yakovlev Yak-130''' (first appearance)

 Music 
 Flag procession, Review, and Address
 Sacred War (Священная Война) by Alexander Alexanderov
 Solemn Triumphal March (Торжественно-Триумфальный Марш) by Valery Khalilov
 March of the Preobrazhensky Regiment (Марш Преображенского Полка) by Unknown
 Slow March of the Officers Schools (Встречный Марш офицерских училищ) by Semyon Tchernetsky
 Slow March to Carry the War Flag (Встречный Марш для выноса Боевого Знамени) by Dmitriy Valentinovich Kadeyev
 Slow March of the Guards of the Navy (Гвардейский Встречный Марш Военно-Морского Флота) by Nikolai Pavlocich Ivanov-Radkevich
 Slow March (Встречный Марш) by Evgeny Aksyonov
 Glory (Славься) by Mikhail Glinka
 Parade Fanfare All Listen! (Парадная Фанфара “Слушайте все!”) by Andrei Golovin
 State Anthem of the Russian Federation (Государственный Гимн Российской Федерации) by Alexander Alexandrov
 Signal Retreat (Сигнал “Отбой”)

 Infantry Column
 March General Miloradovich (Марш “Генерал Милорадович”) by Valery Khalilov
 Triumph of the Winners (Триумф Победителей)
 In Defense of the Homeland (В защиту Родины) by Viktor Sergeyevich Runov
 We are the Army of the People (Мы Армия Народа) by Georgy Viktorovich Mavsesya
 Air March (Авиамарш) by Yuliy Abramovich Khait
 Legendary Sevastopol (Легендарный Севастополь) by Bano Muradeli
 Crew is One Family (Экипаж - одна семья) by Viktor Vasilyevich Pleshak
 March of the Cosmonauts/Friends, I believe (Марш Космонавтов /Я верю, друзья) by Oskar Borisovich Feltsman
 Artillery March (Марш Артиллеристов) by Tikhon Khrennikov
 We Need One Victory (Нам Нужна Одна Победа) by Bulat Shalvovich Okudzhava
 To Serve Russia (Служить России) by Eduard Cemyonovich Khanok
 Sound about the Alarming Youth (Песня о тревожной молодости) by Alexandera Pakhmutova
 March Parade Ground (Марш “Плац”) by Valery Khalilov
 On Guard for the Peace (На страже Мира) by Boris Alexanderovich Diev
 Ballad of a Soldier (Баллада о Солдате) by Vasily Pavlovich Solovyov-Sedoy
 On the Road (В Путь) by Vasily Pavlovich Solovyov-Sedoy
 Victory Day (День Победы) by David Fyodorovich Tukhmanov

 Mobile Column
 March General Miloradovich (Марш “Генерал Милорадович”) by Valery Khalilov
 Invincible and Legendary (Несокрушимая и легендарная) by Alexander Alexandrov
 Legendary Sevastopol (Легендарный Севастополь) by Bano Muradeli
 March Hero (Марш “Герой”) by Unknown
 March Three Tankmen (Марш “Три Танкиста”) by Pokrass Brothers
 March of the Soviet Tankists (Марш сове́тских танки́стов) by Pokrass Brothers
 March Victory (Марш “Победа”) by Albert Mikhailovich Arutyunov
 Katyusha (Катюша) by Matvey Blanter
 Artillery March (Марш Артиллеристов) by Tikhon Khrennikov
 Long Live our State (Да здравствует наша держава) by Boris Alexandrov

 Air Column
 Air March (Авиамарш) by Yuliy Abramovich Khait
 March Airplanes – First of all (Марш “Первым делом самолёты”) by Vasili-Solovyov-Sedoi
 Air March (Авиамарш) by Yuliy Abramovich Khait

 Conclusion
 Invincible and Legendary (Несокрушимая и легендарная) by Alexander Alexandrov
 Farewell of Slavianka'' (Прощание Славянки) by Vasiliy Agapkin

Simultaneous Crimean parades 

Parades occurred in 23 major Russian cities, including the newly incorporated federal city of Sevastopol, which was annexed by Russia (along with the rest of Crimea) in March 2014. Sevastopol also celebrated the 70th anniversary of its liberation from Nazi Germany in May 1944. This year the Crimean Hero City of Kerch also held its first holiday parade, and also celebrated the 70th anniversary of its liberation from Nazi Germany on April 11, 1944. The Sevastopol parade saw the Black Sea Fleet parade for the first time independently of the Ukrainian Navy. Putin also attended a fleet review on the city where he delivered an address.

Aside from these, 50 more cities and towns in Russia planned to hold joint civil/military parades in honor of the celebrations.

Gallery

See also 
 Moscow Victory Parade of 1945
 Victory Day (9 May)

External links 
Victory Day parade on Moscow's Red Square 2014 (FULL VIDEO)
Военно-морской парад в Севастополе 9 мая 2014

References 

Moscow Victory Day Parades
Moscow Victory Day Parade
2014 in military history
2014 in Moscow
May 2014 events in Russia